Vice Admiral Sir Cecil Charles Hughes-Hallet KCB CBE (1898–1985) was a senior Royal Navy officer.

Biography

Born on 6 April 1898, Charles Hughes-Hallet was educated at Bedford School, Emmanuel College, Cambridge, the Royal Naval College, Osborne and at the Royal Naval College, Dartmouth. He served in the Royal Navy during the First World War and was present at the Battle of the Dardanelles and at the Battle of Jutland.  After distinguished service during the Second World War he was appointed as Chief of Staff to the Commander-in-Chief, Home Fleet between 1950 and 1951. He was appointed as Head of British Naval Mission, Washington between 1952 and 1954.

The brother of Vice Admiral John Hughes-Hallett CB DSO, Vice Admiral Charles Hughes-Hallett died on 2 December 1985.

References

External links 

 The Papers of Vice-Admiral Sir Cecil Charles Hughes-Hallett held at Churchill Archives Centre

1898 births
1985 deaths
Royal Navy vice admirals
Alumni of Emmanuel College, Cambridge
People educated at Bedford School
Royal Navy officers of World War II
People educated at the Royal Naval College, Osborne